Chumbhotbongs Paribatra, Prince of Nakhon Sawan II (5 December 1904 – 15 September 1959) was the only son of Prince Paripatra to survive into adulthood.  He married Mom Ratchawong Pantip Devakula. Their daughter is the artist, Princess Marsi Paribatra.

The only surviving male descendant of royal blood from Queen Sukhumala Marasri and an indirect first cousin of the late King Bhumibol Adulyadej (since his father and Prince Mahidol Adulyadej are half-brothers), Chumbhotpong Paripatra was a potential heir to the Thai throne according to the 1924 Palace Law of Succession.

In 1952, Prince Chumbhot converted his private residence into the Suan Pakkad Palace.

Educations
Debsirin School
Harrow School, UK
Christ Church, Oxford, University of Oxford

References
 Paul M. Handley, "The King Never Smiles" Yale University Press: 2006, 

1904 births
1959 deaths
People educated at Harrow School
Alumni of Christ Church, Oxford
Thai male Phra Ong Chao
Paribatra family
Thai male Mom Chao
Heirs apparent who never acceded
20th-century Chakri dynasty